The Chief Sources of English Legal History is a book written by Percy Henry Winfield and published, with an introduction by Roscoe Pound, by Harvard University Press in 1925. It is "bright and lively", "eminently readable", "admirable" and of "great value and usefulness".

References
Winfield, Percy H. The Chief Sources of English Legal History. Harvard University Press. 1925. Snippet view. Reprinted by Beard Books. 2000. . Preview. Google Books. 
Mott, Rodney L. "Book Reviews" (June 1926) The Mississippi Valley Historical Review. Vol 13, No 1. Pages 84 to 86. JSTOR.
Julius Goebel Jr. (September 1926) Political Science Quarterly. Vol 41, No 3. Pages 476 to 479. JSTOR.
Plucknett, Thoedore F T. "Book Reviews" (1926) 39 Harvard Law Review 405 JSTOR.
Zane, John M. "Current Legal Literature". (1926) 12 American Bar Association Journal 172. JSTOR.
Putnam, Bertha Haven. "Reviews of Books" (July 1926) The American Historical Review. Vol 31, No 4. Page 763. JSTOR.
H D H. "Book Reviews" (1926) 2 Cambridge Law Journal 408. JSTOR.
H J L. "Book Reviews and Shorter Notices" (June 1926) Economica. No 17. Page 237. JSTOR.
Sayre, Paul L. "Reviews" (1927) 2 Indiana Law Journal 424. Indiana University.

Books about legal history
Legal history of England